The 2012 San Antonio Scorpions FC season was the club's first season of existence, and first year playing in the North American Soccer League, the second division of the American soccer pyramid. Including the San Antonio Thunder soccer franchise of the original NASL, this was the 3rd season of professional soccer in San Antonio. The Scorpions played at Heroes Stadium in San Antonio.

Competitions

Preseason

North American Soccer League

Standings

Results summary

Results by round

Match reports 
Kickoff times are in CDT (UTC−05) unless shown otherwise

NASL Playoffs

U.S. Open Cup

Club information

Roster 

As of May 11, 2012

References 

San Antonio Scorpions seasons
San Antonio Scorpions FC
San Antonio
San Antonio Scorpions FC season